Reinhard Karl Stumpf  (born 26 November 1961) is a German football manager and former player who was most recently the manager of Saudi Arabian club Al-Diriyah. He played as a centre-back.

Playing career 
Stumpf's active career as a professional footballer encompassed a total of 13 years. In 1984, he made his first appearances in the 2. Bundesliga with Kickers Offenbach. After a short stint with Karlsruher SC, he once again returned to Offenbach in 1987. In 1989, 1. FC Kaiserslautern called him up to the Bundesliga. With Kaiserslautern, Stumpf won the DFB-Pokal in 1990 and the German Championship in 1991. His cup win also provided a football novelty: only a few hours earlier, his sister Daniela Stumpf had won the women's cup competition with FSV Frankfurt on exactly the same pitch. In 1992, Stumpf joined Galatasaray and went on to win the double of Süper Lig title and Turkish Cup in 1993. In 1994, he added yet another Turkish league title to his résumé. Following this success, he returned to Germany. After playing two more seasons at 1. FC Köln, he went to Japan's Brumell Sendai, only to stay there for less than six months. Back in Germany, he joined Hannover 96’s minor league team in 1997 before ending his active professional career here.

Coaching career 
As assistant coach under Otto Rehhagel at 1. FC Kaiserslautern, Stumpf's coaching career kicked off seamlessly. After Rehhagel's resignation in October 2000, Stumpf became head coach, Andreas Brehme taking over as the Red Devils team manager. In 2002, however, Reinhard Stumpf was dismissed. Between September 2002 and May 2007, he worked as assistant coach under Erik Gerets – first until February 2004 at 1. FC Kaiserslautern, which rehired him after his earlier dismissal, followed by one more year at VfL Wolfsburg until 2005. The duo's last stop was a two-year stint with renowned Turkish club Galatasaray, winning the 2005–06 Super Lig. In September 2007, Stumpf succeeded Fuat Çapa as head coach at Gençlerbirliği. His contract, however, was already ended at the end of October. In August 2009, he once again became assistant coach under Erik Gerets, this time at Al-Hilal in the Saudi Professional League. In 2010, he won the Saudi Championship as well as the Crown Prince Cup at Al-Hilal. Following Geret's departure in October 2010, he worked as interim head coach for the professional team before taking over Al-Hilal's U21 team in November 2010. In September 2011 he signed a contract as head coach at Tunisian side Club Sportif Sfaxien.

On 29 December 2011, Sfaxien released Stumpf due to the German's inability to communicate adequately with his underperforming players.

On 5 January 2012, he succeeded Rudi Bommer as manager of German 3. Liga club Wacker Burghausen. In July 2013, Stumpf became head coach of Al-Hilal's U21 team again.

In October 2014, Al Shabab sacked José Morais and was replaced by Stumpf on the bench of Al Shabab.
In summer 2015 he was named as head coach of Al-Ettifaq.

On 21 October 2021, Stumpf was appointed as manager of Al-Diriyah. On 2 February 2022, Stumpf resigned from his post as manager.

Managerial statistics

Honours

As player
1. FC Kaiserslautern Bundesliga: 1990–91
 DFB-Pokal: 1989–90Galatasaray Istanbul Süper Lig: 1992–93, 1993–94
 Turkish Cup: 1992–93

As managerAl Hilal U21 League Prince Faisal Cup: 2014

As assistant managerAl Hilal Saudi Championship: 2010
 Crown Prince Cup: 2010Galatasaray Istanbul'
 Süper Lig: 2005–06

References

External links
Reinhard Stumpf's Official Website
 Reinhard Stumpf Interview

1961 births
Living people
Association football central defenders
German footballers
German expatriate footballers
Kickers Offenbach players
Karlsruher SC players
1. FC Kaiserslautern players
Galatasaray S.K. footballers
1. FC Köln players
Vegalta Sendai players
Hannover 96 players
Süper Lig players
Expatriate footballers in Turkey
Expatriate footballers in Japan
Bundesliga players
German football managers
Galatasaray S.K. (football) non-playing staff
SV Wacker Burghausen managers
Al Hilal SFC
1. FC Kaiserslautern managers
Gençlerbirliği S.K. managers
CS Sfaxien managers
3. Liga managers
Süper Lig managers
Saudi Professional League managers
Saudi First Division League managers
Expatriate football managers in Saudi Arabia
Expatriate football managers in Turkey
German expatriate sportspeople in Japan
German expatriate sportspeople in Saudi Arabia
German expatriate sportspeople in Turkey
West German footballers